Chadbourne, Chadbourn, Chadburn, Chadburne,  or Chatburn may refer to:

People
Chet Chadbourne (1884–1943), American major league baseball player
Eugene Chadbourne (born 1954), American guitarist and banjoist
Glenn Chadbourne (born 1959), American artist and illustrator
Jack Chadburn (1873–1923), English professional footballer
James H. Chadbourn (1905–1982), American legal scholar and professor of law at Harvard University
Joe Chadbourne (1883–1958), English professional footballer
Joshua Chadbourne (1873–1959), American auto mechanic, businessman and apricot farmer
Leo Chadburn, English experimental musician and classical composer, known by his stage name "Simon Bookish"
Lloyd Chadburn (1919–1944), Canadian World War II fighter pilot
Mark Chadbourn (born 1960), English fantasy, horror and science fiction writer
Maud Chadburn (1868–1957), English surgeon, one of the first women in the United Kingdom to pursue that career
Paul A. Chadbourne (1823–1883), American educator and naturalist
Thomas Chadbourne (1871–1938), American lawyer who founded the firm now known as Chadbourne & Parke LLP

Places
Chadbourne Elementary School, a primary school in Fremont, California named for Joshua Chadbourne
Chadbourn, North Carolina, a town in Columbus County, North Carolina
Chatburn, a village in East Lancashire, England
Fort Chadbourne, a fort established by the United States Army in 1852 in present-day Coke County, Texas
Paul A. Chadbourne House, a dormitory at the University of Massachusetts Amherst

Other uses
Chadbourne & Parke, a New York-based international law firm founded by Thomas Chadbourne
Engine order telegraph, a shipboard communications device colloquially known as a chadburn
Wilmington, Chadbourn and Conway Railroad, an American railroad spanning North and South Carolina that operated during the 19th century